Suman Kanjilal is an Indian politician from the All India Trinamool Congress. In May 2021, he was elected as the member of the West Bengal Legislative Assembly from Alipurduar as BJP candidate. On 5 February 2023, he joined All India Trinamool Congress.

Career
Kanjilal is from Alipurduar district. His father's name is Santosh Kumar Kanjilal. He passed LLB From Surya Deo Law College Under B.N Mandal University Bihar in 2009. He contested in 2021 West Bengal Legislative Assembly election from Alipurduar Vidhan Sabha and won the seat on 2 May 2021.

References

21st-century Indian politicians
People from Alipurduar district
Bharatiya Janata Party politicians from West Bengal
West Bengal MLAs 2021–2026
Year of birth missing (living people)
Living people